Gammapapillomavirus is a genus of viruses, in the family Papillomaviridae. Human serve as natural hosts. There are 27 species in this genus. Diseases associated with this genus include: warts, papilloma.

Taxonomy
The following 27 species are assigned to the genus:

 Gammapapillomavirus 1
 Gammapapillomavirus 2
 Gammapapillomavirus 3
 Gammapapillomavirus 4
 Gammapapillomavirus 5
 Gammapapillomavirus 6
 Gammapapillomavirus 7
 Gammapapillomavirus 8
 Gammapapillomavirus 9
 Gammapapillomavirus 10
 Gammapapillomavirus 11
 Gammapapillomavirus 12
 Gammapapillomavirus 13
 Gammapapillomavirus 14
 Gammapapillomavirus 15
 Gammapapillomavirus 16
 Gammapapillomavirus 17
 Gammapapillomavirus 18
 Gammapapillomavirus 19
 Gammapapillomavirus 20
 Gammapapillomavirus 21
 Gammapapillomavirus 22
 Gammapapillomavirus 23
 Gammapapillomavirus 24
 Gammapapillomavirus 25
 Gammapapillomavirus 26
 Gammapapillomavirus 27

Structure
Viruses in Gammapapillomavirus are non-enveloped, with icosahedral geometries, and T=7 symmetry. The diameter is around 60 nm. Genomes are circular, around 8kb in length.

Life cycle
Viral replication is nuclear. Entry into the host cell is achieved by attachment of the viral proteins to host receptors, which mediates endocytosis. Replication follows the dsDNA bidirectional replication model. DNA-templated transcription, with some alternative splicing mechanism is the method of transcription. The virus exits the host cell by nuclear envelope breakdown.
Human serve as the natural host. Transmission routes are contact.

References

External links
 ICTV Report Papillomaviridae
 Viralzone: Gammapapillomavirus

Papillomavirus
Virus genera